Lindze Lanae Letherman (born November 2, 1988) is an American actress, equestrian, trick rider, and general manager. She is known for her roles as Molly in Toothless, Virginia Lofton in Virginia's Run, and Georgie Jones in General Hospital.

Career
Letherman was born in Fresno, California. She appeared on General Hospital as Georgie Jones, the daughter of soap opera supercouple Frisco and Felicia Jones and one-half of the popular teen couple "Dillon and Georgie".

Letherman had a small role in the 2002 movie Clockstoppers as Kelly Gibbs, and has made guest appearances on TV shows, talk shows, and game shows.

Letherman left General Hospital in December 2007, when her character was killed off. She temporarily returned on March 26, 2010, and March 29, 2010, as a ghost.  She once again appeared temporarily returned to speak to Maxie Jones on July 11–12 and December 5, 2013, once again as a ghost.

Letherman also starred in an Independent film in 2007 entitled Stamped! which was filmed with Higher Definition Media, Inspiration Studios and Frontier Film, and was released on February 27, 2009.

Personal life
Lindze Letherman married Adam Etchegoyen on Saturday October 18, 2014. The couple exchanged vows at Stolpman Vineyards in Santa Barbara, CA. Lindze retired from acting in 2018 after she left "General  Hospital" and moved to Aspen, Colorado. Today Lindze Letherman is a general manager for Hooch.

Filmography

References

External links

 Lindze Letherman on LinkedIn

1988 births
20th-century American actresses
21st-century American actresses
American female equestrians
Living people
American film actresses
American soap opera actresses
American television actresses
Actresses from California
Actresses from Fresno, California